The 2022 Frankfurt Galaxy season is the second season of the new Frankfurt Galaxy team in the European League of Football.

Preseason
After change in management and a new general manager with co-owner Christopher Knower the 2021 champion announced starting quarterback Jakeb Sullivan. Shortly after, the franchise re-signed local talent Lorenz Regler for the 2022 season. With effect from May 1st, Jörg Ziesche will be replacing Christopher Knower as general manager.

Regular season

Standings

Schedule

Source: europeanleague.football

Roster

Transactions
From Berlin Thunder: Louis Achaintre, Wael Nasri (February 4, 2022)

Jermaine Brealy Jr. was released after the first regular season game.

Staff

Notes

References 

Frankfurt Galaxy (ELF)
Frankfurt Galaxy
Frankfurt Galaxy